Cullahill or Cullohill is a small village situated on the R639 road in County Laois, Ireland. Cullahill  takes its name from an ancient forest that covered Cullahill Mountain and extended down to Cullahill Castle.

History
A priory of Augustine canons was founded here in 550 by O'Dempsey, under the invocation of St. Tighernach who is now the patron saint of the area.

The village is home to an impressive early 15th century tower house, once the principal stronghold of the MacGillapatricks  of Upper Ossory.  The castle bears the image of a sheela na gig.

Under their patronage, a medical school flourished at Aghmacart townland, about a mile from the castle from before 1500 to c.1610. It was conducted by the Ó Conchubhair family. Its physicians included Donnchadh Óg Ó Conchubhair (fl. 1581-1611), Risteard Ó Conchubhair (1561–1625), Donnchadh Albanach Ó Conchubhair (1571–1647) and Cathal Ó Duinnshléibhe (fl. 1592-1611).

According to 1837 records, Cullohill was listed as a village in the parish of Aghmacart. Aghmacart is now a townland of Cullahill and contains an old church and graveyard which are still in use.

It is now part of Durrow parish and is in the Roman Catholic Diocese of Ossory.

Activities
Cullohill is surrounded by countryside and has several public walkways and trekking trails in the nearby hills.

Public transport
Route 828, operated by M & A Coaches on behalf of the National Transport Authority, provides a daily journey each way to/from Durrow, County Laois, Abbeyleix and Portlaoise. There is no Sunday service.

Sport
The local GAA club is The Harps which was formed in 1984 as an amalgamation with Durrow. Up until then Cullohill had its own hurling team and had won the Laois senior hurling championship in 1955 and 1964. The 1955 team was captained by Lar Dunphy and the 1964 team by Martin Mahony.

Notable people
Darina Allen, née O'Connell, a celebrity chef, is a native of Cullohill. Her family remain there today where they own and run the local pub, The Sports Man's Inn, or O'Connell's, as it is more known locally.

See also
 List of towns and villages in Ireland

References

 The medical school at Aghmacart, Queen's County, Aoibheann Nic Dhonnchadha, Ossory, Laois and Leinster 2, (2006)

External links
Cullohill Castle.
Diocese of Ossary site with Parish details.
Durrow Community Website
Harps Camogie Club Website

Towns and villages in County Laois
Articles on towns and villages in Ireland possibly missing Irish place names
FitzPatrick dynasty